Strathmore is an unincorporated community and census-designated place (CDP) within Aberdeen Township, in Monmouth County, New Jersey, United States. At the 2010 census, the CDP's population was 7,258.

Geography
According to the United States Census Bureau, the CDP had a total area of 2.021 square miles (5.235 km2), including 1.971 square miles (5.105 km2) of land and 0.050 square miles (0.1295 km2) of water (2.47%).

Demographics

Census 2010

Census 2000
At the 2000 census there were 6,740 people, 2,348 households, and 2,031 families living in the CDP. The population density was 1,414.3/km2 (3,654.3/mi2). There were 2,360 housing units at an average density of 495.2/km2 (1,279.6/mi2). The racial makeup of the CDP was 87.79% White, 3.29% African American, 0.06% Native American, 6.50% Asian, 0.64% from other races, and 1.72% from two or more races. Hispanic or Latino of any race were 4.67% of the population.

Of the 2,348 households 38.9% had children under the age of 18 living with them, 76.8% were married couples living together, 7.5% had a female householder with no husband present, and 13.5% were non-families. 11.2% of households were one person and 4.5% were one person aged 65 or older. The average household size was 2.87 and the average family size was 3.11.

The age distribution was 25.1% under the age of 18, 5.1% from 18 to 24, 31.0% from 25 to 44, 27.1% from 45 to 64, and 11.6% 65 or older. The median age was 39 years. For every 100 females, there were 94.6 males. For every 100 females age 18 and over, there were 93.4 males.

The median household income was $85,890 and the median family income  was $90,655. Males had a median income of $61,971 versus $39,559 for females. The per capita income for the CDP was $32,984. About 2.0% of families and 2.3% of the population were below the poverty line, including 3.8% of those under age 18 and 0.6% of those age 65 or over.

Transportation
New Jersey Transit provides bus transportation to the Port Authority Bus Terminal in Midtown Manhattan on the 133 route.

References

Census-designated places in Monmouth County, New Jersey
Aberdeen Township, New Jersey